"Bloodbuzz Ohio" is a single by indie rock band The National, from their fifth studio album, High Violet. It is notable for Matt Berninger's baritone vocals. It was made available for download on the band's website on March 24, 2010. The song was also released on 7" vinyl (with the exclusive B-side "Sin-Eaters") on May 3, 2010. The cover art of this single is a work by artist Mark Fox, titled Jane Jacobs Understands The Beehive.

Julia Stone covered the song on her 2012 album, By the Horns.

Irish artist SOAK covered the song in 2019.

Goose (American band) performed a version of the song on August 18, 2022 at Red Rocks Amphitheatre.

Critical reception
"Bloodbuzz Ohio" received critical reviews as being the first single from High Violet. One Thirty BPM states the track to be "the beating heart of High Violet and most alarming insight into the psyche of the album." Pitchfork's review stated that "Bloodbuzz Ohio" was "a tense, drawn-out build with Matt Berninger's weathered baritone lording all over everything."
On January 26, 2011, the song was voted at number 31 on the Triple J Hottest 100 of 2010, making it their highest entry on the countdown ever. In 2019, Pitchfork ranked the song at number 76 on its list of the 200 Best Songs of the 2010s.

Music video
Matt Berninger is the main focus of the first video from High Violet which shows him dapper in a suit, holding a drink, and walking the streets of New York City, seemingly lost in thought as he sings. Documentary film director D.A. Pennebaker appears in a cameo in the video, playing a bartender.

It was directed by Hope E. Hall, Andreas Burgess, and Berninger's wife Carin Besser.

Performances
The National performed a special live studio performance and interview on American Public Media's Marketplace November 1, 2012.

Track listing
"Bloodbuzz Ohio" (May 3, 2010)
4AD (AD 3X22), 7" vinyl and digital download
 "Bloodbuzz Ohio" – 4:36
 "Sin-Eaters" – 3:40

Chart history
It charted on the Belgian Flanders Ultratop 50 at number 49 for one week on week 25 of 2010. It then re-entered the chart, and on its third week on the chart, the song peaked at number 16. It has also charted on the Ultratip chart in Wallonia region at number 37.

References

2010 singles
The National (band) songs
4AD singles
2010 songs
Songs written by Matt Berninger
Songs written by Aaron Dessner